The Arab Winter is a term for the resurgence of authoritarianism and Islamic extremism in some Arab countries in the 2010s in the aftermath of the Arab Spring protests. The term "Arab Winter" refers to the events across Arab League countries in the Middle East and North Africa, including the Syrian Civil War, the Iraqi insurgency and the subsequent War in Iraq, the Egyptian Crisis, the First Libyan Civil War and the subsequent Second Libyan Civil War, and the Yemeni Civil War. Events referred to as the Arab Winter include those in Egypt that led to the removal of Mohamed Morsi and the seizure of power by General Abdel Fattah el-Sisi in the 2013 Egyptian coup d'état.

The term was first coined by Chinese political scientist Zhang Weiwei during a debate with American political scientist Francis Fukuyama on June 27, 2011. Fukuyama believed the Arab Spring movement would inevitably spread to China, while Zhang predicted the Arab Spring will soon turn into an Arab Winter.

According to scholars of the University of Warsaw, the Arab Spring fully devolved into the Arab Winter four years after its onset, in 2014. The Arab Winter is characterized by the emergence of multiple regional wars, mounting regional instability, economic and demographic decline of Arab countries, and ethno-religious sectarian strife. According to a study by the American University of Beirut, by the summer of 2014, the Arab Winter had resulted in nearly a quarter of a million deaths and millions of refugees. Perhaps the most significant event in the Arab Winter was the rise of the extremist group Islamic State of Iraq and the Levant, which controlled swathes of land in the region from 2014 to 2019.

In 2023, multiple armed conflicts are still continuing that might be seen as a result of the Arab Spring. The Syrian Civil War has caused massive political instability and economic hardship in Syria, with the Syrian currency plunging to new lows. In Yemen, a civil war and subsequent intervention by Saudi Arabia continues to affect the country.  In Lebanon, a major banking crisis is threatening the economy of neighboring Syria.

Definition
The term Arab Winter typically includes the following events:

Geography
The term "Arab Winter" refers to the events across Arab League countries in the Middle East and North Africa, including the Syrian civil war, the Iraqi insurgency and the subsequent War in Iraq, the Egyptian Crisis, the First Libyan Civil War and the subsequent Second Libyan Civil War, and the Yemeni Civil War. Events referred to as the Arab Winter include those in Egypt that led to the removal of Mohamed Morsi and the seizure of power by General Abdel Fattah el-Sisi in the 2013 Egyptian coup d'état.

Political developments, particularly the restoration of authoritarianism and suppression of civil liberties in Egypt since July 3, 2013, have been described as constituting a "military winter" that functioned in opposition to the goals of the Arab Spring. Various militias and tribes have started fighting in Libya after a breakdown in negotiations. The arenas of Lebanon and Bahrain were also identified as areas of the Arab Winter.

Libya was named as a scene of the Arab Winter, together with Syria, by Professor Sean Yom. The Northern Mali conflict was often described as part of the "Islamist Winter". Political changes which occurred in Tunisia, involving a change in government, as well as an ISIL insurgency, were also indicated by some as a possible "heading towards Arab Winter".

Beginning date
The first cases of usage of the Arab Winter term can be found since February 1, 2011.

Then, the Arab Winter term began circulating in the media in late 2012 and getting popular since then, referring to the deterioration of many Arab Spring conflicts into prolonging and escalating events of sectarian strife and armed violence. In its December 2012 publication, The Daily Telegraph referred to the year 2012 as the year of Arab Winter.

According to scholars of the University of Warsaw, the Arab Spring fully devolved into the Arab Winter four years after its onset. This view was also supported by Prof. James Y. Simms Jr. in his 2015 opinion article for the Richmond Times-Dispatch. In early 2016, The Economist marked the situation across Arab world countries as "worse than ever", marking it as the ongoing Arab Winter.

Impact

Economic impact
According to the Moshe Dayan Center for Middle Eastern and African Studies, as of January 2014, the cost of Arab Winter upheaval across the Arab World was some $800 billion USD. Some 16 million people in Syria, Egypt, Iraq, Jordan and Lebanon were expected to require humanitarian assistance in 2014.

According to The Economist, Malta has "benefited" from the Arab Winter, as tourists who might otherwise be in Egypt or Tunisia opt for a safer alternative.

Casualties
According to a study by the American University of Beirut, as of the summer of 2014, the Arab Winter had resulted in nearly a quarter of a million deaths and millions of refugees.

Political columnist and commentator George Will reported that as of early 2017, over 30,000 lives had been lost in Libya, 220,000–320,000 had been killed in Syria and 4 million refugees had been produced by the Syrian Civil War alone.

The Arab Winter is still ongoing as of 2021. Casualties per crisis include:
Syrian Civil War - casualty figure at 570,000 killed and counting - Conflict ongoing
2011 Iraqi insurgency, 2013 civil war, and subsequent Islamic State insurgency - casualty figure at 220,000+ killed and counting - Civil war declared over in 2017, insurgency ongoing
Yemeni Civil War - casualty figure at 350,000+ killed and counting - Conflict ongoing
Libyan Crisis - casualty figure 40,000+ killed and counting - Conflict ongoing
Egyptian Crisis and Sinai insurgency - marked the start of the Arab winter, casualty figure 5,000+ killed and counting - Conflict ongoing

Migrant crisis

The political turmoil and violence in the Middle East and North Africa resulted in massive population displacement in the region. As a result, "boat people", which was once commonly referred to Vietnamese boat people, became frequently used, including internally displaced persons and asylum-seekers and refugees who had previously been residing in Libya, Syria, Iraq and Lebanon, have headed towards the European Union.

The attempts by some Libyans, Syrians and Tunisians to seek safety from the violence by crossing the Mediterranean sea have triggered fears among European politicians and populations of arrivals that might "flood" their shores. This has spurred a flurry of legislative activity and patrolling of the waters to manage arrivals.

See also
 List of modern conflicts in North Africa
 Spillover of the Syrian civil war
 Iran–Saudi Arabia proxy conflict
 Arab Summer

References

External links
 RT – Flames, Fury & Frustration: Arab Spring spins into Arab Winter?
 RT – CrossTalk: Arab Winter?
 Arirang News – Prime Talk: Are we approaching an Arab Winter? Jang Ji-hyang, Asan Institute for Policy Studies
 VICE – Arab Winter: Syrian refugees in Lebanon Bekaa Valley
 Dimitar Mihaylov – Why the Arab Spring Turned into Arab Winter: Understanding the Middle East Crises through Culture, Religion, and Literature

 
2010s conflicts
2010s in Africa
2010s in Asia
Winter
Arab history
History of North Africa
History of the Middle East